Al-Rabita Sports Club also known as Al-Rabita Kosti is a Sudanese football club based in Kosti. They play in the second division in Sudanese football, Sudan Second Division.

National

Kosti League
Champion:

References

External links
Team profile – soccerway.com
Team profile – footballzz.com
 Official forum website

Football clubs in Sudan
1947 establishments in Sudan
Association football clubs established in 1947